Episkopoi (sing. , episkopos, literally "overseer"), Latinized episcopus/episcopi, were inspectors who were sometimes sent by the Athenians to subject states. Harpocration compares them to the Lacedaemonian harmosts, and says that they were also called phylakes (φύλακες, "guardians"). It appears that these episkopoi received a salary at the cost of the cities over which they presided.

The term was used in early Christianity to refer to overseers of local churches. It has often been translated as "overseers," "pastors," "shepherds," or "bishops."

See also
Bishop
Epistates

References

Aristoph. Aves, 1022, &c., with Schol.'; 
Harpocrat. s. v. ; Bockh, Publ. Econ. of Athens^ pp. 156, 238j 2d ed. ;
Schomann, Antiq. Juris Pub. Graec. p. 432. 18.

Athenian Empire
Ancient Greek titles